Torpedo Bombers is a Soviet war drama film directed by Semyon Aranovich based on the unfinished story of Yuri German.

Plot 
1944 year. The Second World War. The naval aviation regiment is based at a small airfield. For pilots, this is both front and rear. They complete combat missions and return to their families. But each flight may be the last.

Cast 
 Rodion Nakhapetov as Senior Lieutenant Alexander Belobrov
 Aleksei Zharkov as Petty Officer Fyodor Cherepets
 Andrei Boltnev as Captain-Engineer Gavrilov
 Stanislav Sadalskiy as Senior Lieutenant Dmitrienko
 Tatyana Kravchenko as Masha
 Vera Glagoleva as Shura
 Nadezhda Lukashevich as Nastya
 Vsevolod Shilovsky as Sergeant Major Artyukhov
 Sergey Bekhterev as Lieutenant Colonel Kurochkin
 Aleksandr Filippenko as Soviet Air Force Major-General
 Yury Kuznetsov as Lieutenant Colonel Fomenko, Air Regiment Commander
 Eduard Volodarsky as guard captain, crew commander
 Vyacheslav Voronin as episode

Awards
1984 All-Union Film Festival
 Prize for the Best military-patriotic film
 Jury diploma  for Best Cinematography (Vladimir Ilyin)
1986 USSR State Prize 
 Svetlana Karmalita, Semyon Aranovich, Vladimir Ilyin, Isaac Kaplan, Rodion Nakhapetov

References

External links 
 

1983 films
1980s Russian-language films
Soviet drama films
1983 drama films
Films about aviators
Films about shot-down aviators
Lenfilm films
Films directed by Semyon Aranovich
Films based on Russian novels